All Monsters Are Human (stylized in all caps) is the fifth studio album by American singer-songwriter K. Michelle, released on January 31, 2020. The album was originally scheduled for release on December 6, 2019, but was delayed. All Monsters Are Human was preceded by the release of two singles, "Supahood" and "The Rain". To promote the album, Michelle embarked on the O.S.D. Tour in 2019.

Background and writing
On June 26, 2018, Michelle said via Twitter that her next album would be titled "All Monsters Are Human". On October, Michelle announced that she would instead be calling her next project FAB, an acronym for "Fuck All U Bitches". On November 19, 2018, Michelle released the song "Save Me". It was later announced that she had signed a new record deal with Entertainment One Music. In July 2019, Michelle then confirmed that her fifth album would be officially titled "All Monsters Are Human".

During a radio interview with Morning Hustle, Michelle explained the meaning behind the title: "Everybody in here is a villain to somebody and in somebody's story, you're not an angel... So All Monsters Are Human, we all have been hurt and hurt so that's where the title comes from because we always say you are this and that but you're the same thing to someone else so if you see it in me it's in you for you to even notice it."

Critical reception 

Writing for The Guardian, Rachel Aroesti said the album "centres on the slick, soulful, 80s-style R&B that has provided the foundation for K Michelle's career". Aroesti described Michelle's vocals on the album as "rich and glassy" and said that they are "coated in the kind of vocoder effect that makes them glitch and ripple nauseatingly". Chris Malone of Forbes said that the album registers as an "otherwise solid offering" from the singer and later added: "While the new material is a much-welcome glimpse into the mind of the singer, it also struggles in distinguishing itself from her previous albums". Brittany Burton of Respect wrote that All Monsters Are Human is "by far K. Michelle's biggest release to date" and also said that the most notable element of the album is the "effortless production" put into it. Edward Bowser of Stereo In Soul gave the album a positive review and rated it 3 out of 5 stars, saying that "the strength of All Monsters are Human, and K. Michelle's music in general, is her willingness to be totally transparent." and later added that it is "far from perfect – things get much too uneven on the second half – but it's honest, emotional R&B." Antwaine Folk of Rated R&B said: "At 13 songs, K. Michelle took no interest in carrying the torch of new-wave R&B on her first independent release. Instead, she took a fresh and even nostalgic turn that finds her remaining very much her own artist." He later added: "It's easy to listen to All Monsters Are Human and love each record without skipping one. In fact, hitting the repeat button on a few cuts is likely to happen more than once. Each song is a moment, so they should be praised back-to-back for their separate glory." Elle Breezy of Singersroom reviewed the album, writing: "On 'All Monsters Are Human', K. Michelle seems to be in her comfort zone, delivering songs that are near and dear to her current life."

Singles
The lead single from the album, titled "Supahood", featuring American rappers City Girls and Kash Doll, was released on September 20, 2019. It is a R&B song with trap and crunk influences, described by critics as a "fierce ladies night anthem" and as a "street anthem". "The Rain", produced by Jazze Pha, was released as the second single on October 25, 2019. The song debuted at number 28 on the US Digital Song Sales chart.

Commercial performance
All Monsters Are Human was released on January 31, 2020. Following the album's release, it debuted at number 51 on the US Billboard 200 with first week sales of 8,200 copies.

Track listing

Charts

See also
List of 2020 albums

References

Album chart usages for BillboardRandBHipHop
Album chart usages for Billboard200
Album chart usages for BillboardIndependent
K. Michelle albums
2020 albums
MNRK Music Group albums
Albums produced by Keyz (producer)
Albums produced by Jazze Pha
Albums produced by Lee Major
Albums produced by Lil' Ronnie
Albums produced by Drumma Boy